These are the list of programs broadcast by The Filipino Channel.

Current programming

Teleseryes

 The Iron Heart (2022)

Entertainment
 Best Talk With Boy Abunda (2021–present)
 Kumu Star Ka with Papa Ahwel (2021–present)
 MYX News (2020–present)
 SeenZone (2018–present)

Variety shows
 ASAP Natin 'To (1995–present)
 It's Showtime (2009–present)
 It's Showtime Online (2020–present)

Educational/Children's shows
 Bahay Book Club 
 Bayani 
 Epol/Apple 
 The Fat Kid Inside 
 Hiraya Manawari 
 MathDali  
 Sine'skwela 
 Team Yey! 
 Wikaharian

Game
 Everybody, Sing!

Talk shows
 Adobo Nation (2008–present)
 Bawal Mastress Drilon (2020–present)
 I Feel U (2020–present)
 Kabayani Talks (2018–present)
 Lakas Tawa (2020–present)
 Magandang Buhay (2016–present)
 Real Talk: The Heart of the Matter (2021–present)
 Thank You, Doc (2021–present)
 We Rise Together (2020–present)

News
 ABS-CBN TeleRadyo on TFC (2008–present)
 News Patrol (2005–present)
 TV Patrol (1987–present (ABS-CBN, Kapamilya Channel/A2Z), 1994–present (TFC))
 TV Patrol Weekend (2004–present(ABS-CBN, Kapamilya Channel/A2Z)
 TV Patrol Live (2013–present)
 ABS-CBN News Channel on TFC (2017–present)
 The World Tonight (1994–1999 (ABS-CBN/TFC) 2020–present (ABS-CBN News Channel, Kapamilya Channel/TFC)
 The World Tonight Saturday (2020–present (ABS-CBN News Channel/TFC)
 TFC News
 Asia Pacific Edition (2017–present)
 Middle East-Europe Edition (2018–present)
 TFC This Week (2018–present)
Balitang Indonesia  (2021–present; Filipino Newscast)
Balitang Malaysia  (2021–present; Filipino Newscast)

Current affairs
 ANC Conversations (2020–present)

Infotainment
 At The Table (Season 2) (2017–present)
 Barangay USA Super Show (2011–present)
 Casa Daza (2017–present)
 Citizen Pinoy (2004–present)
 Food Prints (2020–present)
 K World (2017–present)
 K World ATM (2020–present)
 Kwentong Barber (2021–present)
 Metro Chats (2021–present)
 Potluck (2020–present)
 Rated Korina (2020–present)
 So Janelle (2016–present)
 Swak na Swak (2006–present)
 Team FitFil (2020–present)
 TFC Connect (2008–present)
 thatguySLATER (2021–present)

Religious shows
 The Healing Eucharist (2006–present)
 Kapamilya Daily Mass (2020–present)
 Kapamilya Journeys of Hope (2020–present)
 Bro. Eddie Villanueva Classics (2020; also broadcast on A2Z Channel 11)

Movie blocks
 CineBro  (2020–present) 
 Reel Deal  (2020–present)

Specials
 G Diaries (2017–present)
 Star Magic Specials (2021–present)
 iWant Originals (2020–present)

Interstitial and short programming
 Star Music Presents: Beats x Pieces (2021-)
 On the Rise (presented by all RISE Artist Studio artist members) (2021-present)

Future programming

Previous programming

Teleseryes
The following rerun teleseryes were aired on The Filipino Channel and part of a temporary programming changes due to the enhanced community quarantine done to lower the spread of the COVID-19 pandemic in the Philippines which began in March 2020. Other rerun teleseryes were aired as a replacement when a rerun teleserye has ended.

 100 Days to Heaven (2011; reruns)
 Walang Hanggan (2012 TV series) (2012; reruns)
 Got to Believe  (2013-2014; reruns)
 On the Wings of Love (TV series) (2015-2016; reruns)
 Tubig at Langis (2016; reruns)
 Wildflower (TV series)  (2017-2018; reruns)

Replacements:
 Forevermore (2014–2015; reruns)
Current:

 A Soldier’s Heart (2020)
 Love Thy Woman (2020)
 Ang sa Iyo ay Akin (2020-2021)
 Walang Hanggang Paalam (2020-2021)
 Bagong Umaga (2020-2021)
 Huwag Kang Mangamba (2021)
 Init sa Magdamag (2021)
 Marry Me, Marry You (2021)
 Viral Scandal (2021–2022)
 He’s Into Her (2021–2022)
 The Broken Marriage Vow (2022)

Asianovelas
 Lovers in Paris (2007)
 Love in the Moonlight (2020)
 The Tale of Nokdu (2020)
 Hwarang (2020)
 Go Back Couple (2020)
 F4 Thailand: Boys Over Flowers (2022)

Newscasts
 Balitang Europe (2005-2014)
 Balitang Middle East (2004-2014)
 Balitang Australia (2007-2010)
 Balitang America (2002-2021)

Reality
 Pinoy Big Brother: Connect (2020–2021)
 Your Face Sounds Familiar (season 3) (2021)
 Pinoy Big Brother: Kumunity Season 10 (2021–2022)
 Idol Philippines (season 2) (2022)

Specials
 Aja! Aja! Tayo sa Jeju (2021) Ja

See also
List of iWant TFC original programming
List of programs broadcast by ABS-CBN
List of programs broadcast by Kapamilya Channel
List of ABS-CBN specials aired

References

External links

The Filipino Channel original programming
Filipino Channel